The 2016 Open Championship was a men's major golf championship and the 145th Open Championship, played from 14–17 July at Royal Troon Golf Club in Ayrshire, Scotland. It was the ninth Open Championship played at the Old Course of Troon, and the fifth since gaining royal status.

Henrik Stenson shot a final round 63 for 264, a record 20-under par, three strokes ahead of runner-up Phil Mickelson, the 2013 champion. The leader after 54 holes, Stenson became the first Scandinavian man to win a major title.

This was the final appearance for 1997 champion Justin Leonard.

Media
This was the first Open Championship under new television rights deals in the United Kingdom and United States. In the U.K., Sky Sports replaced the BBC, who held broadcast rights from 1955 to 2015, marking the first time that rights to the Open had been held by a subscription television service. To comply with anti-siphoning laws, rights to broadcast a nightly highlights programme on free-to-air television were sold to the BBC. The contract was to begin in 2017, but the BBC opted out of the 2016 edition.

In the U.S., television rights shifted from ESPN to NBC and sister pay-TV network Golf Channel, marking the first time that Golf Channel had coverage of a men's major championship. It also restored a major to the network for the first time since 2014; from 1995 to 2014, NBC televised the U.S. Open and other championships of the USGA, which moved to Fox Sports in 2015. Similarly to the BBC, ESPN chose to opt out of its final year of Open rights, causing NBC's rights to begin in 2016 instead.

Venue

Old Course

Lengths of the course for previous Opens:

 2004: , par 71
 1997: , par 71
 1989: , par 72
 1982: , par 72

 1973: , par 72   
 1962: , par 72
 1950: , par 70
 1923: 

Opens from 1962 through 1989 played the 11th hole as a par-5.

Field
Each player is classified according to the first category in which he qualified, but other categories are shown in parentheses.

1. The Open Champions aged 60 or under on 17 July 2016
Mark Calcavecchia, Darren Clarke (2), Ben Curtis, John Daly, David Duval, Ernie Els (2), Todd Hamilton, Pádraig Harrington (2), Zach Johnson (2,3,4,12,14), Paul Lawrie, Justin Leonard, Sandy Lyle, Rory McIlroy (2,4,5,6,10,12), Phil Mickelson (2,4,14), Mark O'Meara, Louis Oosthuizen (2,3,4,5,12,14)
Stewart Cink (2) and Tiger Woods (2) did not play.
Eligible but did not enter: Nick Faldo, Ian Baker-Finch, Tom Lehman, Nick Price.

2. The Open Champions for 2006–2015

3. First 10 and anyone tying for 10th place in the 2015 Open Championship
Jason Day (4,10,11,12,14), Sergio García (4), Marc Leishman (4,14), Jordan Niebrugge, Justin Rose (4,5,8,12), Adam Scott (4,9,14), Jordan Spieth (4,8,9,12,14), Danny Willett (4,5,9)
Brooks Koepka (4,12) withdrew with an ankle injury.

4. The first 50 players on the Official World Golf Ranking (OWGR) for Week 21, 2016
An Byeong-hun (5,6), Kiradech Aphibarnrat (5), Rafa Cabrera-Bello, Paul Casey (12), Kevin Chappell, Matt Fitzpatrick (5), Rickie Fowler (11,12,14), Jim Furyk (12), Branden Grace (5,14), Emiliano Grillo, Bill Haas (12,14), Charley Hoffman (12), J. B. Holmes (12,14), Billy Horschel, Thongchai Jaidee (5,14), Dustin Johnson (8,12,14), Kim Kyung-tae (19), Kevin Kisner (12), Søren Kjeldsen (5), Russell Knox, Matt Kuchar (12,14), Danny Lee (12,14), David Lingmerth, Shane Lowry (5), Hideki Matsuyama (12,14), Ryan Moore, Kevin Na (12), Patrick Reed (5,12,14), Charl Schwartzel (5,14), Brandt Snedeker (12), Henrik Stenson (5,12), Andy Sullivan (5), Justin Thomas, Jimmy Walker (12,14), Bubba Watson (9,12,14), Lee Westwood (OQS-Thailand), Bernd Wiesberger (5)
Daniel Berger (12) withdrew with a shoulder injury.

5. First 30 in the Race to Dubai for 2015
Kristoffer Broberg, Victor Dubuisson, Ross Fisher, Tommy Fleetwood, David Howell, Miguel Ángel Jiménez, Martin Kaymer (8,11), Anirban Lahiri (14,15), James Morrison, Thorbjørn Olesen, Thomas Pieters, Marc Warren, Chris Wood (6)
Jaco van Zyl withdrew to focus on the Olympics.

6. The BMW PGA Championship winners for 2014–2016

7. First 5 European Tour members and any European Tour members tying for 5th place, not otherwise exempt, in the top 20 of the Race to Dubai on completion of the 2016 BMW International Open
Andrew Johnston, Rikard Karlberg, Lee Soo-min, Joost Luiten

8. The U.S. Open Champions for 2012–2016
Webb Simpson

9. The Masters Tournament Champions for 2012–2016

10. The PGA Champions for 2011–2015
Keegan Bradley, Jason Dufner

11. The Players Champions for 2014–2016

12. Top 30 players from the final 2015 FedEx Cup points list
Steven Bowditch (14), Harris English, Scott Piercy, Robert Streb
Bae Sang-moon (14) was unable to compete due to a military obligation in South Korea.

13. First 5 PGA Tour members and any PGA Tour members tying for 5th place, not exempt in the top 20 of the PGA Tour FedEx Cup points list for 2016 on completion of the 2016 Quicken Loans National
Smylie Kaufman, William McGirt

14. Playing members of the 2015 Presidents Cup teams
Chris Kirk

15. First and anyone tying for 1st place on the Order of Merit of the Asian Tour for 2015

16. First and anyone tying for 1st place on the Order of Merit of the PGA Tour of Australasia for 2015
Nathan Holman

17. First and anyone tying for 1st place on the Order of Merit of the Southern Africa PGA Sunshine Tour for 2015
George Coetzee

18. The Japan Open Champion for 2015
Satoshi Kodaira

19. First 2 and anyone tying for 2nd place, not exempt, on the Official Money List of the Japan Golf Tour for 2015
Yūsaku Miyazato

20. First 2 and anyone tying for 2nd place, in a cumulative money list taken from all official 2016 Japan Golf Tour events up to and including the 2016 Japan Golf Tour Championship
Yuta Ikeda, Yosuke Tsukada

21. The Senior Open Champion for 2015
Marco Dawson

22. The Amateur Champion for 2016
Scott Gregory (a)

23. The U.S. Amateur Champion for 2015
Bryson DeChambeau forfeited his exemption by turning professional in April 2016.

24. The European Amateur Champion for 2015
Stefano Mazzoli (a)

25. The Mark H. McCormack Medal winner for 2015
Jon Rahm forfeited his exemption by turning professional in June 2016 but subsequently earned a spot through the Open Qualifying Series.

Open Qualifying Series

The Open Qualifying Series (OQS) consists of 10 events from the six major tours. Places are available to the leading players (not otherwise exempt) who finish in the top n and ties. In the event of ties, positions go to players ranked highest according to that week's OWGR.

The Greenbrier Classic was cancelled due to the damage sustained by the course in the 2016 West Virginia flood. The Open Qualifying Series event originally slated for the Greenbrier was shifted to the Barracuda Championship.
Final Qualifying

The Final Qualifying events were played on 28 June at four courses covering Scotland and the North-West, Central and South-coast regions of England. Three qualifying places were available at each location.  None of the twelve qualifiers had played in Regional Qualifying on 20 June: each was exempted by virtue of holding an Official World Golf Ranking.

Gailes Links – Oskar Arvidsson, Scott Fernández, Colin Montgomerie
Hillside – Dave Coupland, Paul Howard, Jack Senior
Royal Cinque Ports – Steven Alker, James Heath, Matthew Southgate
Woburn – Paul Dunne, Ryan Evans, Robert Rock

Alternates

To make up the full field of 156, additional places are allocated in ranking order from the Official World Golf Ranking at the time that these places are made available by the Championship Committee. Any places made available after 3 July will use the week 27 rankings. Eleven places were made available on 27 June based on the week 26 rankings.

James Hahn (ranked 58, week 26)
Gary Woodland (65)
Ryan Palmer (68)
Patton Kizzire (70)
Fabián Gómez (71)
Wang Jeung-hun (74)
Scott Hend (75)
Graeme McDowell (76)
Brendan Steele (77)
Francesco Molinari (78)
Tony Finau (79)
Jim Herman (80) – replaced Billy Hurley III
Marcus Fraser (81) – replaced Tiger Woods
Luke Donald (ranked 83, week 27) – replaced Jaco van Zyl
Daniel Summerhays (86) – replaced Stewart Cink
Charles Howell III (87) – did not play due to injury
Jamie Lovemark (88) – replaced Daniel Berger
Ian Poulter (90) – did not play due to injury
Colt Knost (92) – replaced Brooks Koepka

Round summaries

First round
Thursday, 14 July 2016

Phil Mickelson shot an 8-under-par 63 to take a three-shot lead over Martin Kaymer and Patrick Reed. His 63 tied him with 27 others for the lowest round in a major championship. Mickelson had a 16-foot putt at the 18th to become the first player to score 62 at a major championship, but the putt lipped out of the hole.

Second round
Friday, 15 July 2016

Phil Mickelson maintained his lead at the halfway point at 132 (−10), a stroke ahead of Henrik Stenson, whose 65 moved him into solo second place. The cut was at 146 (+4), allowing previous major champions Jordan Spieth, Danny Willett, and Bubba Watson to continue onto the third day. Billy Horschel started in joint fourth place, but had a dismal 85 to miss the cut by six strokes.

Amateurs: Gregory (+9), Mazzoli (+12)

Third round
Saturday, 16 July 2016

Henrik Stenson (68) overtook  Phil Mickelson (70) in the third round, taking a single-shot lead into the final round, with Mickelson five shots clear of the field.

Final round
Sunday, 17 July 2016

In what earned instant acclaim as one of the greatest final-round duels in major championship history, Henrik Stenson broke the aggregate scoring record for all majors while establishing a new Open Championship record on his way to his first career major win. In the final pairing with Phil Mickelson, Stenson began the round with a one-shot advantage. Mickelson quickly jumped into the lead with a birdie at the first while Stenson three-putted for bogey. Stenson rebounded with five birdies on the front nine while Mickelson recorded a birdie and an eagle at the par-5 fourth, giving Stenson back a one-shot lead at the turn.

Both birdied the tenth, then Stenson made bogey at the eleventh and they were tied again. Both parred the next two holes, then Stenson recorded three consecutive birdies, including a  putt from off the green on the 15th to open up a two-shot lead. Mickelson narrowly missed an eagle putt on the 16th while Stenson got up and down from the greenside rough for a birdie to maintain the advantage. With another birdie at the 18th, Stenson tied the major championship scoring record at 63 (−8). Runner-up Mickelson shot 267 to equal the previous Open record set by Greg Norman in 1993. Eleven strokes behind Mickelson in solo third was J. B. Holmes at 278 (−6).

Final leaderboard

 
Source:

Scorecard

Cumulative tournament scores, relative to par

Source:

Records
 Stenson became the second to finish 20-under-par in a major championship, tying Jason Day's record from the PGA Championship in 2015.
 Stenson was the first to finish 20-under at the Open Championship, beating Tiger Woods' record of 19-under in 2000.
 Stenson's 264 set a new major championship record, beating David Toms' 265 in the PGA Championship in 2001.
 Stenson broke the previous Open Championship record by three shots, formerly 267, set by Greg Norman in 1993.
 Stenson's 63 (in round 4) and Mickelson's (in round 1) tied the major record for a round.  It was the 28th and 29th time this score had been achieved, and Stenson was the 27th different player to do so. Stenson and Johnny Miller are the only players to shoot 63 in the final round of a major and win.
 Mickelson, age 46, became the oldest player to shoot a round of 63 in an Open Championship and also the second-oldest player to shoot 63 in any major championship; Gary Player shot 63 in the second round of the PGA Championship in 1984 at age 48.
 The 11-shot difference between Stenson and Mickelson with the rest of the field was the largest in history.

References

External links
Royal Troon 2016 (Official site)
Coverage on the European Tour's official site
Coverage on the PGA Tour's official site
Coverage on the PGA of America's official site

The Open Championship
Golf tournaments in Scotland
Open Championship
Open Championship
Open Championship